Shree Amarsingh Secondary School (referred to as AMSS) (Nepali: श्री अमरसिँह माध्यमिक विद्यालय) is a secondary school opened from amount collected from post war reconstruction fund established after World War as  Soldier's Board Vocational Training High School  on March 26, 1957. After 10 years it was handed over to Government of Nepal on September 14, 1966 and renamed to its present name.

Introduction 
Braille medium (established : 1981 A.D), English medium (established : 1985 A.D) and Plus-two stream (established 1999 A.D) are the sections of this institution.Plus two level is affiliated to HSEB (Higher Secondary Education Board) while school level is under Government of Nepal. The school was awarded as Model Higher Secondary School in 2004 A.D, Best National in 2006 A.D, Regional Best Community Higher School in 2005 A.D, 2007 A.D, 2008 A.D. Science, Management, Education and Humanities are the courses offered under Higher Secondary level and curriculum of school level is practised in school level.

It is located in Amarsingh Chowk, Pokhara, Nepal.

The motto of the school is "Always Aim High"

Courses 
 School Leaving Certificate (SLC) (nationwide curriculum until Class 10, prescribed by the Ministry of Education, Nepal)
 10+2 in Science, Management, Education, Humanities Stream (Higher Secondary Education Board (HSEB), Sano Thimi, Nepal)

Administration 
 Mr. Tejswi Baral, Headmaster
 Mrs. Tara Kunwar - Accountant
 Mr. Niranjan Lohani - Office Assistant
 Miss Anita Paudel - Asst. Librarian
 Mr. Tek Bdr. Gurung - Lab Assistant(Physics)
 Mr. Chiran Giri - Lab Technician(zoology)
 Mr. Daya Raj Pun - Lab Technician(Chemistry)

Scholarship Programme 
School Provides a wide range of scholarships to deserving students who fulfill the given criteria. However an admitted student can receive only one type of scholarship:
 SLC Score Scholarship
 Entrance Exam Scholarship
 HSEB Exam Scholarship
 Scholarship for the Handicapped
 Students Welfare Fund Scholarship
 Term Exam Scholarship
 Dalit Scholarship

Admission 
Students who have passed SEE are eligible to apply for admission in Class XI (Science or Management or Humanities or Education). The applications are to be duly filled in application forms available from the school office with all supporting documents within the given deadline. All applicants should go through an entrance test conducted by the school along with an interview prior to the entrance test. Students  are admitted according to their merit on the basis of SEE marks, entrance test marks and interview.

Teaching Methodology 
The school incorporates diversity in teaching, questioning, explaining, modeling and demonstrating. Teachers adopt a flexible approach with multiple learning styles to help students retain information and strengthen understanding. Effective teaching learning methods reinforced by the use of technology in the school bring out critical thinking and a desire to learn.

Laboratory 
The school is well-equipped with several laboratories for Physics, Chemistry, Zoology, Botany and Computer. Laboratories are well equipped and well maintained and help students transfer their learning into useful practical knowledge.

Library 
Library occupies a place of pride in AMHSS and is an essential component of school's outstanding education mission.

References

Secondary schools in Nepal
Schools in Pokhara
Educational institutions established in 1957
1957 establishments in Nepal